Siah Kalleh or Siah Koleh may refer to:

Siah Koleh, Gilan
Siah Kalleh, Lorestan